Bagalur is a town in the Hosur taluk of Krishnagiri district, Tamil Nadu state, India. The nearest city is Hosur, which is located 10 km away. This village is 5 km from the state of Karnataka.

Education 
Bagalur is rich in educational institutions which includes 4 Government Schools and 7 Private educational institutions.

References 

 

Villages in Krishnagiri district